Stefano Pozza (born 6 August 1987 in Schio) is an Italian football defender who currently plays for Real Vicenza.

Caps on Italian Series 

Serie C2 : 20 Caps, 1 Goal

Serie D : 74 Caps, 4 Goals

External links
http://aic.football.it/scheda/20796/pozza-stefano.htm

1987 births
Living people
Italian footballers
A.C. Giacomense players
Association football defenders
People from Schio
Sportspeople from the Province of Vicenza
Footballers from Veneto